Youssef Seddik may refer to:

 Youssef Seddik (philosopher) (born 1943), Tunisian Greek and Islamic philosopher 
 Youssef Seddik (revolutionary) (1910–1975), Egyptian military figure and politician